Frank Giacoia (July 6, 1924 – February 4, 1989) was an American comics artist known primarily as an inker. He sometimes worked under the name Frank Ray, and to a lesser extent Phil Zupa, and the single moniker Espoia, the latter used for collaborations with fellow inker Mike Esposito.

Biography

Early life and career
Frank Giacoia studied at Manhattan's School of Industrial Art (later the High School of Art and Design) and the Art Students League of New York. He entered the comics industry by penciling the feature "Jack Frost" in U.S.A. Comics #3 (cover-dated Jan. 1942), inked by friend and high school classmate Carmine Infantino — the latter's first art for comics and published by Marvel Comics' 1940s precursor, Timely Comics. His friend and collaborator Carmine Infantino, a classmate at the Art Students League, recalled that

Later in 1941, Giacoia joined the New York City comic-book packager Eisner & Iger, the studio of Golden Age greats Will Eisner and Jerry Iger. His early works include drawing crime comics for Ace Comics, horror for Avon Publishing, and a multitude of characters for National Comics Publications (the primary company that evolved into DC Comics) including the Flash and Batman.

Other companies for which Giacoia did art during the 1940s and 1950s include Crestwood Publications, Dell Comics, Eastern Color Printing, Fawcett Comics, Harvey Comics, Lev Gleason Publications, and Timely Comics, the 1940s predecessor of Marvel Comics. Giacoia and writer Otto Binder introduced the short-lived character Captain Wonder in Kid Komics #1 (Feb. 1943).

Later career
During the 1960s Silver Age of comic books, Giacoia became best known as a Marvel Comics inker, particularly on Captain America stories penciled by the character's co-creator Jack Kirby. One of the company's preeminent names, he worked on virtually every title at one time or another. Giacoia inked the first appearance of the Punisher in The Amazing Spider-Man #129 (Feb. 1974).

Giacoia also worked on the newspaper comic strip The Amazing Spider-Man (based on the Marvel comic book series of the same name) from 1978–1981, as well as on the strips Flash Gordon, The Incredible Hulk, Johnny Reb and Billy Yank, Sherlock Holmes, and Thorne McBride.

He was credited as the pseudonym "Frankie Ray" for some time. In Fantastic Four #53 (August 1966), his real name was announced in the "Bullpen Bulletins".

Awards and honors
Giacoia was nominated for the Shazam Award for Best Inker (Dramatic Division) in 1974. The 1989 graphic novel The Amazing Spider-Man: Parallel Lives, the back cover of which was inked by Giacoia, is dedicated to his memory.

He posthumously won one of the two annual Inkwell Awards Joe Sinnott Hall of Fame Awards in 2016. The award was received by his great-nephew, Mike Giacoia.

Critical assessment
In its list of "The 20 Greatest Inkers of American Comic Books", historians at the retailer Atlas Comics (no relation to the comics publishers) listed Giacoia at #5:

Bibliography

Archie Comics
 All New Adventures of the Mighty Crusaders #1–2 (1983)
 The Fly #1 (1983)
 Fly-Man #39 (1966)
 Mighty Comics #40, 43 (1966–1967)
 Mighty Crusaders #1–2 (1965–1966)
 Mighty Crusaders vol. 2 #11–12 (1985)
 Thunderbunny #1 (1984)

Atlas/Seaboard Comics
 Phoenix #4 (1975)

DC Comics

 Action Comics #425 (1973)
 Adventure Comics #399, 401, 457, 459, 495–496 (1970–1983)
 Adventures of Rex the Wonder Dog #1, 4, 6 (1952)
 All-American Men of War #127 (1952)
 All-American Men of War vol. 2 #10, 26, 51 (1954–1957)
 All-American Western #103–111, 113, 117, 126 (1948–1952)
 All-Flash #31–32 (1947)
 All Star Comics #38, 40–41, 52, 54–57 (1947–1951)
 All-Star Squadron Annual #3 (1984)
 All-Star Western #58–67, 69–70, 96, 99–101, 106 (1951–1959)
 Aquaman #46 (1969)
 Batman #229, 280 (1971–1976)
 Big Town #5–10, 17 (1951–1952)
 Blackhawk #260, 268 (1983–1984)
 Boy Commandos #35 (1949)
 Challengers of the Unknown #71–72 (1969–1970)
 Comic Cavalcade #24 (1947)
 Dale Evans Comics #1 (1948)
 Danger Trail #1–5 (1950–1951)
 Daring New Adventures of Supergirl #7 (1983)
 DC Special Series #7 (1977)
 Detective Comics #206, 403–406, 409, 436, 465, 529 (1954–1983)
 Falling in Love #24–25, 139 (1959–1973)
 The Flash #108, 146, 228, 261, 311 (1959–1982)
 Flash Comics #90, 93–94, 96, 98–99, 104 (1947–1949)
 Gang Busters #8 (1949)
 Girls' Love Stories #15, 63, 116–120, 123, 154 (1952–1970)
 Green Lantern #36–38 (1949)
 Green Lantern vol. 2 #77–78, 155 (1970–1982)
 House of Mystery #190, 196–197, 202 (1971–1972)
 House of Secrets #88 (1970)
 Isis #2 (1976)
 Jimmy Wakely #1–5 (1949–1950)
 Justice League of America #44–45, 200 (1966–1982)
 My Greatest Adventure #7 (1956)
 Mystery in Space #3, 5, 9, 12, 16–18, 30, 40, 50–53 (1951–1959)
 New Adventures of Superboy #49 (1984)
 Our Army at War #1, 20, 23, 26 (1952–1954)
 Our Fighting Forces #28–29 (1957–1958)
 Phantom Stranger #3, 5–6 (1952–1953)
 Romance Trail #1, 4 (1949–1950)
 Secret Hearts #8, 102, 141 (1952–1970)
 Sensation Comics #94, 97–105, 107–109 (1949–1952)
 Sensation Mystery #110–116 (1952–1953)
 Showcase #8, 13–14, 17, 92–93 (1957–1970)
 Sinister House of Secret Love #3 (1972)
 Strange Adventures #8, 11, 15, 20, 30–32, 34, 37–38, 43, 63, 81–82, 86, 97, 101–103 (1951–1959)
 Supergirl #6 (1973)
 Superman #277, 279, 329 (1974–1978)
 The Superman Family #189–190 (1978)
 The Unexpected #115, 119, 123, 128, 131, 133, 145, 190 (1969–1979)
 Unknown Soldier #216 (1978)
 Weird War Tales #123 (1983)
 Western Comics #64–67, 69 (1957–1958)
 The Witching Hour #13, 18 (1971)
 Wonder Woman #214, 307–308 (1974–1983)
 World's Finest Comics #40–41, 52–53, 219, 292, 294 (1949–1983)

Dell Comics
 Cadet Gray of West Point #1 (1958)

Eclipse Comics
 Xyr #1 (1987)

Marvel Comics

 2001: A Space Odyssey Marvel Treasury Special #1 (1976)
 Adventure into Fear #25–26 (1974–1975)
 Adventures into Weird Worlds #9 (1952)
 Amazing Adventures #10, 13, 15, 20 (1972–1973)
 The Amazing Spider-Man #97–107, 127–131, 133–145, 150, 170, 172, 184, 194, 196, 235–237, 239, 241, Annual #5, 10 (1968–1983)
 Astonishing Tales #5, 7, 11, 20 (1971–1973)
 The Avengers #26–31, 73, 85, 87, 110, 118, Annual #2 (1966–1973)
 Captain America #106, 125–126, 152, 167, 183–185, 193–194, 197–204, 206–209, 256, Annual #3 (1968–1981)
 Captain Marvel #22, 42 (1972–1976)
 Chamber of Darkness #1 (1969)
 Champions #10 (1977)
 Conan the Barbarian #5 (1971)
 Crazy Magazine #77 (1981)
 Daredevil #14–25, 27, 36, 38, 101–102, 112 (1966–1974)
 Defenders #1, 28 (1972–1975)
 Doc Savage #6 (1973)
 Fantastic Four #39, 93, 96–97, 114, 143, 154, Annual #5 (1965–1975)
 Frankenstein #10 (1974)
 Ghost Rider #12 (1975)
 Godzilla #2 (1977)
 Haunt of Horror #3 (1974)
 Howard the Duck #28 (1978)
 The Hulk! #12 (1978)
 The Incredible Hulk #103–104, 152, Annual #6 (1968–1977)
 Iron Man #42, 57–58, 62 (1971–1973)
 Iron Man and Sub-Mariner #1 (1968)
 John Carter, Warlord of Mars #15 (1978)
 Journey into Mystery #115 (1965)
 Journey into Mystery vol. 2 #5 (1973)
 Marvel Feature #1 (1971)
 Marvel Premiere #8, 45 (1973–1978)
 Marvel Super-Heroes #12 (1967)
 Marvel Team-Up #3, 10, 13, 19–22, 25–27, 53, 78 (1972–1979)
 Marvel Two-in-One #4, 44, 98, 100, Annual #3 (1974–1983)
 Moon Knight #8 (1981)
 Ms. Marvel #11 (1977)
 My Love #4–5 (1970)
 Nick Fury, Agent of S.H.I.E.L.D. #2 (1968)
 Not Brand Echh #1–3, 5, 9 (1967–1968)
 Nova #6–12 (1977)
 Power Man #35, 40 (1976–1977)
 Rawhide Kid #47 (1965)
 Sgt. Fury and his Howling Commandos #16, 19–20, 23–24, Annual #1 (1965)
 The Spectacular Spider-Man #2 (1968)
 Star Wars #54 (1981)
 Strange Tales #128–129, 141, 150, 162–163, 165, 171 (1965–1973)
 Sub-Mariner #1–5, 49, 62 (1968–1973)
 Supernatural Thrillers #1 (1972)
 Tales of Suspense #63–64, 67–68, 77–79, 81–82, 84–93, 95–98 (1965–1968)
 Tales to Astonish #66–67, 92–92, 101 (1965–1968)
 Thor #306 (1981)
 Two-Gun Kid #73 (1965)
 U.S.A. Comics #3 (1942)
 What If...? #15, 24, 31 (1979–1982)
 Young Allies #6, 9, 12, 18–20 (1943–1946)

Skywald Publications
 Nightmare #3 (1971)

Standard Comics
 Adventures into Darkness #6 (1952)

Tower Comics
 Dynamo #1 (1966)
 Fight the Enemy #1–3 (1966–1967)
 T.H.U.N.D.E.R. Agents #1–12 (1965–1967)
 Undersea Agent #3 (1966)

References

External links
 
 Frank Giaocia at the Unofficial Handbook of Marvel Comics Creators

1924 births
1988 deaths
20th-century American artists
American comics artists
American comic strip cartoonists
American people of Italian descent
Art Students League of New York alumni
Comics inkers
DC Comics people
Golden Age comics creators
High School of Art and Design alumni
Marvel Comics people
Silver Age comics creators